MagicWB is a third-party Workbench enhancer for AmigaOS. It was developed in 1992-1997 by Martin Huttenloher.

History
The idea to enhance Workbench arose when the author got bored with the gray and abstract icons provided by Commodore. The original Amiga icons could use only four colours and even those were scarcely used. The background patterns supplied with the operating system for Workbench were also minimal. Desire to develop complete package to enhance Workbench look with complete set of icons, background patterns and new fonts was born.

Features
The original Amiga icon sets supported only four colours. MagicWB extended palette of icons to 8 colours allowing more colourful icons. The MagicWB grew so popular that it became de facto standard for many major third party packages developed for Amiga. One of those is MUI which used extensively MagicWB palette in its GUI widget library.

The design style in MagicWB was XEN. The package includes 9 replacement fonts (Topaz, XEN and Courier) and new background patterns for the Workbench desktop.

Other Workbench enhancers
The MagicWB package grew popular but many users found limiting icon sets to 8 fixed colours too limiting. Competing Workbench enhancer, NewIcons, was developed to allow more colourful icons. This eventually led to GlowIcons and finally to true colour PNG icons.

References

See also 

AmigaOS
Computer icons